The 2018–19 Second Men's League of Serbia is the 13th season of the Second Basketball League of Serbia, the 2nd-tier men's professional basketball league in Serbia.

Teams

Promotion and relegation 
Teams promoted to the First League (1st-tier)
Sloboda
Novi Pazar
Teams relegated from the First League (1st-tier)
Radnički
Sloga
Teams promoted from the First Regional League (3rd-tier)
Vrbas
Zemun Fitofarmacija
Rtanj
Zlatar
Teams relegated to the First Regional League (3rd-tier)
Plana
Akademik
Konstantin
Smederevo 1953

Suspensions 
In July 2018, the Basketball Federation of Serbia did not issued the competitions licenses to Klik and KK Zlatar for competing in the 2018–19 season due to unfulfilled requirements of the competition. Thus, KK Plana and OKK Konstantin were to stay in the league.

Venues and locations

League table

Statistics

Individual statistic leaders

Source: Eurobasket

See also
 2018–19 Basketball League of Serbia
 2018–19 Basketball Cup of Serbia

References

External links
 Official website of Second Basketball League
 League Standings at eurobasket.com
 League Standings at srbijasport.net

Second Basketball League of Serbia
Serbia
Basketball